The Sarda is a breed of domestic sheep indigenous to the island of Sardinia. It is raised throughout Italy, and in other Mediterranean countries, particularly Tunisia. The Sarda is considered to be among the best Italian breeds of sheep for production of sheep's milk; most of the milk is used to make pecorino sardo cheese. The Sarda is highly adaptable; it may be kept on lowland or on mountainous terrains, and is suitable both for intensive and for extensive or transhumant management. The long, coarse white wool is used for weaving carpets and other goods.

In the late 19th and early 20th centuries a number of attempts were made to improve the breed by cross-breeding with Merino, Rambouillet, Barbaresca, Gentile di Puglia, Sopravissana and Vissana breeds among others. These experiments invariably had a negative impact on milk production. Recent selection has been aimed at improving the conformation of the udder and at making it more suitable for mechanised milking.

The Sarda is one of the seventeen autochthonous Italian sheep breeds for which a genealogical herdbook is kept by the Associazione Nazionale della Pastorizia, the Italian national association of sheep-breeders. The herdbook was established in 1928. Total numbers for the breed are estimated at 5,000,000; in 2013 the number recorded in the herdbook was 225,207.

References

See also

Sheep breeds originating in Italy
Fauna of Sardinia